Michał Chrapek (born 3 April 1992) is a Polish professional footballer who plays as a midfielder for Ekstraklasa club Piast Gliwice.

Club career

Early career
Chrapek started training football at age of 7 in community centre team at OPP Jaworzno. He played there as a right back for 3 years. Then he joined Victoria Jaworzno.

Wisła Kraków
In 2007, he moved to Wisła Kraków youth team. On 15 March 2009, he made his debut in Młoda Ekstraklasa team of Wisła. On 11 December 2009, he made his first team debut in the Ekstraklasa game against Zagłębie Lubin. In August 2011, he signed a one-year loan deal with Kolejarz Stróże, where he played in all 30 games of the 2011–12 season, scoring 3 goals.

Calcio Catania
On 12 June 2014, Chrapek moved to Italy and signed for Calcio Catania.

Lechia Gdańsk
After an unsuccessful year in Italy, he signed for Polish Ekstraklasa side Lechia Gdańsk.

Śląsk Wrocław
On 22 June 2017 he signed a contract with Śląsk Wrocław.

Piast Gliwice
On 10 October 2020, he joined Piast Gliwice.

International career
Chrapek has played internationally for Poland beginning with the Under-17 level and up to the U-21 national team.

References

External links
 
 

1992 births
People from Jaworzno
Sportspeople from Silesian Voivodeship
Living people
Polish footballers
Association football midfielders
Poland youth international footballers
Poland under-21 international footballers
Victoria Jaworzno players
Wisła Kraków players
Kolejarz Stróże players
Catania S.S.D. players
Lechia Gdańsk players
Lechia Gdańsk II players
Śląsk Wrocław players
Piast Gliwice players
Ekstraklasa players
Serie B players
Polish expatriate footballers
Expatriate footballers in Italy